Daniel Mendes may refer to:

 Daniel Mendes (footballer, born 1981), Brazilian footballer
 Daniel Mendes (footballer, born 1993), Brazilian footballer